The 2021 Victoria's Voice Foundation 200 presented by Westgate Resorts was the 19th stock car race of the 2021 NASCAR Camping World Truck Series season. The race was held on September 24, 2021 in North Las Vegas, Nevada at Las Vegas Motor Speedway, a  permanent D-shaped oval racetrack. The race took 134 laps to complete. In a historic first, ThorSport Racing and their 4 cars would all end up finishing 1-2-3-4, with Christian Eckes getting his first ever win in the series, driving a part-time schedule for ThorSport Racing. Ben Rhodes and Matt Crafton would fill in the rest of the podium positions, finishing 2nd and 3rd, respectively. Johnny Sauter would come back during the final restart to help complete the historic feat to finish 4th.

Background 

Las Vegas Motor Speedway, located in Clark County, Nevada outside the Las Vegas city limits and about 15 miles northeast of the Las Vegas Strip, is a 1,200-acre (490 ha) complex of multiple tracks for motorsports racing. The complex is owned by Speedway Motorsports, Inc., which is headquartered in Charlotte, North Carolina.

Entry list 

*Driver would change to Keith McGee for the race, after gambling $10,000 in Las Vegas for sponsorship.

Qualifying 
Qualifying was determined by a metric qualifying system based on the last race, the 2021 UNOH 200. As a result, John Hunter Nemechek of Kyle Busch Motorsports would win the pole.

Race results 
Stage 1 Laps: 40

Stage 2 Laps: 40

Stage 3 Laps: 54

References 

2021 NASCAR Camping World Truck Series
NASCAR races at Las Vegas Motor Speedway
Victoria's Voice Foundation 200
Victoria's Voice Foundation 200